The 2015 Kano State gubernatorial election occurred on April 11, 2015. APC candidate Abdullahi Umar Ganduje won the election, defeating PDP Salihu Sagir Takai and other candidates.

Abdullahi Umar Ganduje emerged APC's candidate in the primary election. He scored 5,588 votes, defeating Lawal Jafaru Isa who scored 126 votes. He chose Hafiz Abubakar as his running mate.

Salihu Sagir Takai emerged PDP's candidate in the primary election, scoring 1,226 votes out of 1,452 cast and defeating three other candidates. Abba Murtala, Mansur Ahmed and Bello Gwarzo were the three other candidates. Murtala scored 140 votes, Ahmed scored 106 and Gwarzo scored 24. He chose Abba Murtala Mohammed as his running mate.

APC primary
Abdullahi Umar Ganduje emerged APC's candidate in the primary election and chose Hafiz Abubakar as his running mate.

Hafiz Abubakar is a professor of Food Science at Bayero University Kano.

He is also the Deputy Vice Chancellor (Academics) at Bayero University Kano. He was a one-time Commissioner for Finance during the first tenure of Rabiu Kwankwaso between 1999 to 2003.

PDP primary
Salihu Sagir Takai emerged People's Democratic Party (Nigeria) (PDP's) candidate in the primary election and chose Abba Murtala Mohammed as his running mate. Abba Murtala Mohammed is the son of the late Head of State in Nigeria, Murtala Muhammed.

Results
Abdullahi Umar Ganduje from the APC won the election defeating Salihu Sagir Takai and other candidates. The total number of registered voters in the state was 5,006,713, accredited voters was 2,238,369, total votes cast was 2,109,811, valid votes was 2,073,165 and rejected votes was 36,646.

Abdullahi Umar Ganduje, (APC)- 1,546,434 votes
Salihu Sagir Takai, (PDP)- 509,726 votes
Others- 17,005 votes

References 

Kano State gubernatorial elections
Gubernatorial election 2015
Kano State gubernatorial election